Where Love Is is a 1917 silent film drama based on the 1903 novel by William J. Locke and starring Ann Murdock.

An incomplete copy is preserved at the Library of Congress.

Cast
Ann Murdock - Norma Hardacre
Shirley Mason - Aline Marden
Mabel Trunnelle - Mrs. Constance Deering
Henry Stanford - Jimmie Padgate
Bigelow Cooper - Morland King
William Wadsworth - Theodore Weever
Raymond McKee - Tony Merewether
Helen Strickland - ?unknown role
Edith Wright - ?unknown role
Jessie Stevens - ?unknown role

References

External links

1917 films
American silent feature films
Films based on British novels
1917 drama films
Silent American drama films
American black-and-white films
1910s American films